Charles Townley FRS (1 October 1737 – 3 January 1805) was a wealthy English country gentleman, antiquary and collector, a member of the Towneley family. He travelled on three Grand Tours to Italy, buying antique sculpture, vases, coins, manuscripts and Old Master drawings and paintings. Many of the most important pieces from his collection, especially the Townley Marbles (or Towneley Marbles) are now in the British Museum's Department of Greek and Roman Antiquities. The marbles were overshadowed at the time, and still today, by the Elgin Marbles.

Biography
Charles Townley was born in England at Towneley Hall, the family seat, near Burnley in Lancashire, on 1 October 1737. (He regularly spelt his name Townley, so this is the spelling usually used in modern literature for him, but still usually not for his marbles.) From a Catholic family and thus excluded both from public office and from English universities, he was educated at the English College, Douai, and subsequently under John Turberville Needham, the biologist and Roman Catholic priest.

In 1758 he took up his residence at Towneley Hall, where he lived the ordinary life of a country gentleman until 1765, when he left England on the Grand Tour, chiefly to Rome, which he also visited in 1772–1773 and 1777. He also made several excursions to Southern Italy and Sicily. In conjunction with various dealers, including Gavin Hamilton, and Thomas Jenkins, a dealer in antiquities in Rome, he got together a splendid collection of antiquities, known especially for the "Towneley Marbles" (or "Townley"), which was deposited in 1778 in a house built for the purpose in Park Street, now No. 14 Queen Anne's Gate, in the West End of London, where he died on 8 January 1805.

His solitary publication was an account of the Ribchester Helmet in Vetusta Monumenta, a Roman cavalry helmet found near Towneley Hall, and now in the British Museum. He was elected a Fellow of the Royal Society in March 1791. He became a member of the Society of Dilettanti 1786, and made a trustee of the British Museum in 1791.

A large archive of Townley's papers, including diaries, account books, bills, correspondence, and catalogues, was acquired by the British Museum in 1992.

A bust of Townley was made in Carrara marble in 1807 by his associate and friend, sculptor Joseph Nollekens.  It shows Townley in herm form – head and neck only, without full shoulders or arms – with a bare neck, dishevelled hair and a pensive expression.  The National Heritage Memorial Fund, in whose 2008-9 annual report the bust is described as "masterfully executed", made a grant of £187,000 to help purchase the bust so that it could be returned to Towneley Hall Museum in the collector's former family home on the outskirts of Burnley.

Townley Collection

The antiquities collected by Townley, which now constitute the Townley Collection at the British Museum, consists of some 300 items and includes one of the great collections of Graeco-Roman sculptures and other artefacts. Prominent amongst this collection are:

 The Cannibal a fragmentary sculpture of two boys fighting over a game of knucklebones identified by Johann Joachim Winckelmann as the Astragalizontes by the classical Greek sculptor Polykleitos
 Bust of Clytie, thought by Townley to be Isis emerging from a sacred lotus
 Townley Hadrian
Townley Antinous
 Cista Mystica
 A relief of Pan with Jupiter and three nymphs holding shells
 Pair of statues of Pan, signed by Marcus Cossutius Cerdo
 Tombstone of the shoemaker Xanthippos
 Townley Caryatid
 Townley Discobolus by Myron, from Hadrian's Villa
 Townley Greyhounds
 Townley Sphinx
 Townley Vase, from the Villa of Antoninus Pius at Monte Cagnolo
Townley Venus

When Townley died in 1805 his family sold the collection of marbles, larger bronzes and terracottas to the British Museum for £20,000 – a sum probably a fraction of its original purchase price. The trustees of the museum obtained a parliamentary grant specifically for the purpose. The smaller antiquities, including coins, engraved gems, and pottery, followed in 1814.

Townley fully intended to leave this collection to the British Museum, as indicated in his will. However, shortly before his death he decided to leave it to the care of his brother Edward and his uncle John Townley on the condition that the sculptures should be exhibited in a purpose-built gallery. The gallery was duly constructed, but as the collection of the Museum's Greek and Roman antiquities grew, it became clear that the old Montague House, the original home of the Museum, was too small for its purpose. The old Jacobean mansion and its Palladian-style Townley Gallery were pulled down in 1823 and gradually replaced with grand rooms arranged over two floors around a central courtyard, today's quadrangular building.

Painting by Johann Zoffany

Charles Townley became the most famous member of the family and another of the treasures now at Towneley is a conversation piece  by Johan Zoffany of Townley in his London house surrounded by an imaginary arrangement of his major sculptures (over forty are represented). Engaged in discussion with him are three fellow connoisseurs, the palaeographer Charles Astle, Hon. Charles Francis Greville, F.R.S., and Pierre-François Hugues d'Hancarville.

Prominent in front are Townley's Roman marble of the Discobolus, the Nymph with a Shell, of which the most famous variant was also in the Borghese collection and a Faun of the Barberini type. On a pedestal in front of the fireplace, the Boys Fighting from the Barberini collection had been Towneley's first major purchase, in 1768 (Winckelmann had identified it as a lost original by Polykleitos). In point of fact, Towneley's only Greek original appears to have been the grave relief on the left wall above the Bust of a Maenad posed on a wall bracket.

The so-called Bust of Clytie perches on the small writing-table, in Zoffany's assembly of the Townley marbles. It was extensively reproduced in marble, plaster, and the white bisque porcelain called parian ware for its supposed resemblance to Parian marble. Goethe owned two casts of this. The Bust of Clytie was apparently Townley's favourite sculpture and the one he took with him when he was forced to flee his home during the anti-Catholic riots of 1780.

The Townley Venus on a Roman well-head that serves as drum pedestal had been discovered by Gavin Hamilton at Ostia and quietly shipped out of the Papal States as two fragmentary pieces. The marble Townley Vase, also furtively exported, stands on the bookcase at the rear: it was excavated about 1774 by Gavin Hamilton at Monte Cagnolo.

Notes

References

Further reading
 I. Bignamini, C. Hornsby, Digging And Dealing in Eighteenth-Century Rome (2010), p. 326–331
 Tony Kitto, 'The celebrated connoisseur: Charles Townley, 1737–1805', in Minerva Magazine (May/June 2005), in connection with a British Museum exhibition celebrating the bicentennial of the Townley purchase. 
 A Dictionary of British and Irish Travellers in Italy, 1701–1800, Compiled from the Brinsley Ford Archive by John Ingamells (1997)
  Sir Henry Ellis: The Townley Gallery of Classic Sculpture in the British Museum 1846.

B.F. Cook, The Townley Marbles London, The British Museum Press, 1985
Nicole Cochrane, 'Ancient art and the eighteenth-century auction: Collecting, catalogues and competition' Journal for Eighteenth-Century Studies 2021

1737 births
1805 deaths
18th-century antiquarians
19th-century antiquarians
English art collectors
People from Burnley
People associated with the British Museum

Fellows of the Royal Society
English antiquarians
English College, Douai alumni
English Roman Catholics